The 1966 winners of the Torneo di Viareggio (in English, the Viareggio Tournament, officially the Viareggio Cup World Football Tournament Coppa Carnevale), the annual youth football tournament held in Viareggio, Tuscany, are listed below.

Format
The 16 teams are organized in knockout rounds. The round of 16 are played in two-legs, while the rest of the rounds are single tie.

Participating teams

Italian teams

  Bologna
  Fiorentina
  Genoa
  Inter Milan
  Juventus
  Lanerossi Vicenza
  Milan
  Napoli

European teams

  Rapid Wien
  Austria Wien
  Eintracht Frankfurt
  Dukla Praha
  CSKA Sofia
  Partizan Beograd
  Augsburg
  Honvéd

Tournament fixtures

Champions

Footnotes

External links
 Official Site (Italian)
 Results on RSSSF.com

1966
1965–66 in Italian football
1965–66 in Yugoslav football
1965–66 in Hungarian football
1965–66 in German football
1965–66 in Czechoslovak football
1965–66 in Bulgarian football
1965–66 in Austrian football